William M. Bodiford (born December 3, 1955) is an American professor and author. He teaches Buddhist Studies and the religion of Japan and East Asia at the University of California, Los Angeles.

Education and early career
In his section "Acknowledgments" in his book Sōtō Zen in Medieval Japan, Bodiford thanks the monks of the Eihei-ji temple in Japan who "kindly broke the rules" to teach him, before his university education began, about Sōtō Zen and Japanese beer.

Bodiford earned his PhD in Buddhist Studies at Yale University and did additional graduate training at the University of Tsukuba and Komazawa University.

Before moving to UCLA, he taught at Davidson College, the University of Iowa, and Meiji Gakuin University in Tokyo and Yokohama, Japan.

Sōtō Zen in Medieval Japan
Bodiford's book Sōtō Zen in Medieval Japan (1993 and 2008) began as his dissertation written at Yale under Stanley Weinstein. Fabio Rambelli, who reviewed the book in 1994 for The Journal of Asian Studies, writes that the author delivers an alternative to the "traditional dichotomy between 'pure' Zen and 'popular' religion". Christopher Ives writes in the Journal of Japanese Studies that the book is the "most important English work on Sōtō Zen to date".

Other activities and research
He presented his paper on the birth of Ise Shinto at the 2008 annual meeting of the Association for Asian Studies (AAS) in a session organized by Rambelli. In 2009, Bodiford participated with Shoji Yamada of International Research Center for Japanese Studies in Japan and William R. Lafleur of the University of Pennsylvania in a panel at the AAS annual meeting.
In 2011, he sat on a panel with Steven Heine, Taigen Dan Leighton, Shohaku Okumura and others for a conference on Dogen Zenji organized by Heine's school, Florida International University.

Bodiford researches Japanese history from medieval times to the present. He has published works on the Tendai and Vinaya Buddhist traditions, on Shinto, and other subjects. He is an associate editor of Macmillan Reference USA's Encyclopedia of Buddhism.

Publications

Books

Articles

Notes

External links
William Bodiford, UCLA, Terasaki Center for Japanese Studies

Living people
American philosophy academics
American religion academics
American Buddhist studies scholars
Yale Graduate School of Arts and Sciences alumni
University of Tsukuba alumni
Komazawa University alumni
Davidson College faculty
University of Iowa faculty
University of California, Los Angeles faculty
American Japanologists
1955 births
Academic staff of Meiji Gakuin University